Duyure is a municipality located in the Honduran department of Choluteca.

The municipality borders Nicaragua to the east, the department of El Paraíso to the north, the municipality of Morolica to the west, and the municipality of San Marcos de Colón to the south.  The Choluteca River runs along the northern and western limits of the municipality.  The town center is located 32 kilometers North of the city of San Marcos de Colón via a dirt road connected to the Pan-American Highway.

Located in the center of the municipality is the town center which is surrounded by seven satellite villages and several small housing clusters.  The seven satellite villages located outside of the urban center are named: Apasupo, Liraqui, Tierras Coloradas, Carrizal Prieto, El Horno, Alto Pino, and San Lorenzo.  Each village contains a public school that educates children ranging from kindergarten to sixth grade.  The town center has both a primary school and a high school.

History 
Duyure used to be called Valle de la Soledad. In the 1895 Honduran national census it was register as a municipality.

Town center
In the center of Duyure stands a large Guanacaste tree which serves as a centerpiece for the town's grassy Central Park.  Several large trees, from Acacia to Tamarind, can be found throughout the park.  Town Hall faces Central Park from the north side of the park and is located adjacent to the town's only Pool Hall.  To the east side of the park stands the Catholic church.  The church is rumored to have been constructed during the 19th century, although the interior of the structure underwent renovation in 2008.  Neighboring the Catholic church sits the local computer center, formally known as the "Community Center for Knowledge and Communication" (CCCC).  Located to the west side of the park is the Health Center (CESAMO) and the town Kindergarten.

Transportation
To date, the only available public transportation is a 1.5-hour-long bus ride to San Marcos de Colón.  The bus leaves from Duyure for San Marcos de Colón at 6:00 AM and returns to Duyure from San Marcos de Colón at 3:30 PM daily.

Demographics 
According to the 2013 census, 78% of the population work in agriculture. Fifty-one percent of people uses the public water system and 66% uses the public electricity system. Ninety-five percent uses firewood for cooking and 6% of houses has at least one car. Fifty-seven percent of duyure has a basic education system.

Geography 
Duyure has 5 villages (aldeas) and 57 hamlets. List of villages:

 Duyure
 Arado Grande
 El Carrizal Prieto
 El Horno
 Liraqui
 Tierra Colorada

References

External links
 Duyure Adelante - A non-profit organization established in 1999 that provides aid to Duyure.

Municipalities of the Choluteca Department